Aldo Carosi (born 30 June 1951) is an Italian judge. He has been a Judge of the Constitutional Court of Italy since 13 September 2011 and has served as one of its Vice Presidents since 24 February 2016.

Career
Carosi was born in Viterbo. He was a judge on the Court of Auditors before being appointed to the Constitutional Court by the Court of Auditors on 17 July 2011. He was sworn in on 13 September 2011. When Paolo Grossi became President of the Court on 24 February 2016, he named Carosi Vice President. He was confirmed in this position by President Giorgio Lattanzi on 8 March 2018 and by President Marta Cartabia on 11 December 2019.

Carosi was made Knight Grand Cross in the Order of Merit of the Italian Republic on 24 October 2011.

References

1951 births
Living people
Judges of the Constitutional Court of Italy
Knights Grand Cross of the Order of Merit of the Italian Republic
People from Viterbo
Vice Presidents of the Constitutional Court of Italy